Psalm 19 is the 19th psalm in the Book of Psalms, beginning in English in the King James Version: "The heavens declare the glory of God; and the firmament sheweth his handywork." In the slightly different numbering system used in the Greek Septuagint and Latin Vulgate translations of the Bible, this psalm is Psalm 18. The Latin version begins "Caeli enarrant gloriam Dei". The psalm is attributed to David.

The psalm considers the glory of God in creation, and moves to reflect on the character and use of "the law of the ". Psalm 1, this psalm and Psalm 119 have been referred to as "the psalms of the Law". It forms a regular part of Jewish, Catholic, Anglican, Eastern Orthodox Church and Protestant liturgies. It has often been set to music, notably by Heinrich Schütz, by Johann Sebastian Bach who began a cantata with its beginning, by Joseph Haydn, who based a movement from Die Schöpfung on the psalm, and by Beethoven, who set a paraphrase by Gellert in "Die Himmel rühmen des Ewigen Ehre".

Text

Hebrew Bible version
Following is the Hebrew text of Psalm 19:

King James Version
 The heavens declare the glory of God; and the firmament sheweth his handywork. 
 Day unto day uttereth speech, and night unto night sheweth knowledge. 
 There is no speech nor language, where their voice is not heard. 
 Their line is gone out through all the earth, and their words to the end of the world. In them hath he set a tabernacle for the sun, 
 Which is as a bridegroom coming out of his chamber, and rejoiceth as a strong man to run a race. 
 His going forth is from the end of the heaven, and his circuit unto the ends of it: and there is nothing hid from the heat thereof. 
 More to be desired are they than gold, yea, than much fine gold: sweeter also than honey and the honeycomb. 
 Moreover by them is thy servant warned: and in keeping of them there is great reward. 
 Who can understand his errors? cleanse thou me from secret faults. 
 Keep back thy servant also from presumptuous sins; let them not have dominion over me: then shall I be upright, and I shall be innocent from the great transgression. 
 Let the words of my mouth, and the meditation of my heart, be acceptable in thy sight, O , my strength, and my redeemer.

Commentary
The classical Jewish commentators all point to the connection the psalmist makes between the sun and the Torah. These connections include:
The Torah enlightens man, just as the sun lights his way (Rashi)
Both the sun and the Torah testify to the glory of their Creator (Ibn Ezra and Radak)
The Torah is more perfect, whole, or complete than the powerful sun (Metzudat David)
While the sun conveys God's glory and greatness in the physical world, the Torah expresses God's glory in the spiritual realm (Malbim).

According to the Baptist preacher Charles Spurgeon, this psalm compares and contrasts "the study of God's two great books—nature and Scripture". Explaining the emphasis on the heavens, Spurgeon explains, "The book of nature has three leaves, heaven, earth, and sea, of which heaven is the first and the most glorious…” Beginning in verse 7 (KJV), the psalmist then extols the perfection of the law of Moses and "the doctrine of God, the whole run and rule of sacred Writ".

John Mason Good theorizes that this psalm was composed either in the morning or around noon, when the bright sun eclipses the other heavenly bodies; he contrasts this with Psalm 8, in which the psalmist contemplates the starry sky in the evening. Praising the poetry of this psalm, 20th-century British writer C. S. Lewis is quoted as saying: "I take this to be the greatest poem in the Psalter and one of the greatest lyrics in the world".

On the matter of unity, Artur Weiser states that the first part (verses 1 to 7) are a completely distinct song from the second (verses 8 to 15). He upholds that not only the subjects, but also the metrics, the language and the tone are distinct and the two parts could not have been composed by the same author. Lewis, on the other hand, indicates nature as "an index, a symbol, a manifestation, of the Divine" and he points that here "the searching and cleansing sun becomes an image of the searching and cleansing Law", on which he suppresses the idea of these two subjects not being correlated. Rav Elchanan Samet identifies the same problems that Weiser did: "These two halves are strikingly different from one another in their content as well as in their style, to the point that it is difficult to point to verbal, stylistic, or conceptual connections between them." Nonetheless, he points that these two parts have been in unity since the Septuagint and agrees with it, "the inclination to adopt this [critical] solution is liable to stem from intellectual laziness."

Uses
The final verse in both the Hebrew and KJV versions, "Let the words of my mouth, and the meditation of my heart, be acceptable in thy sight, O Lord, my strength, and my Redeemer," is used as a prayer in both the Jewish and Christian traditions. A version which refers to "the meditation of our hearts", i.e. those of the congregation, is often used at the start of a sermon.

Judaism
Psalm 19 is recited in its entirety during the Pesukei dezimra of Shabbat and Yom Tov. It is also recited as the psalm of the day on Shavuot in the Gra siddur. In Siddur Avodas Yisroel, it is recited as the psalm of the day on Hanukkah, and as the Shabbat psalm for the Torah portion of Yitro. Some say this psalm on a wedding day, and as a prayer for heavenly guidance.

The verses of this psalm are recited before each hakafah on Simchat Torah.

In the ancient Jewish text Perek Shirah, verse 2 (in the Hebrew) is said by the heavens and verse 3 is said by the day.

Verses 8 and 9 (in the Hebrew) are recited in the synagogue after the first person is called up to the Torah.

Verses 12 and 13 (in the Hebrew) are part of Selichos.

Verse 15 (in the Hebrew) is recited in several parts of the Jewish prayer service, including: at the conclusion of the Amidah; during the removal of the Torah scroll from the Ark on Rosh Hashanah, Yom Kippur, and Yom Tov; as part of Selichos; and at the conclusion of Tefillah Zakah, a prayer for Yom Kippur eve.

New Testament
Verse 4 is quoted in Romans .

Catholic Church
In the Rule of Saint Benedict of the Benedictine Order, the psalm is to be recited at Prime on Saturdays.

Book of Common Prayer
In the Church of England's Book of Common Prayer, this psalm is appointed to be read on the morning of the fourth day of the month.

Musical settings
Psalm 19 has been set to music several times. 

In France, Jean-Joseph Cassanéa de Mondonville composed in 1749, le grand motet de type versaillais "Cæli enarrant gloriam Dei " and Camille Saint-Saëns composed in 1865 one "Cæli enarrant" (Psaume XVIII) op. 42. 

Notable settings to German texts include: 
 Heinrich Schütz in "", SWV 115 as part of the Becker Psalter, published in 1628.
 Johann Sebastian Bach in the cantata , BWV 76 (1723)
 Joseph Haydn in "Die Himmel erzählen" ("The Heavens are Telling") –  the chorus at the end of part 1 of his oratorio Die Schöpfung (1798)
 Ludwig van Beethoven in his 1803 song for voice and piano, "", setting a paraphrase by Gellert in "Die Himmel rühmen des Ewigen Ehre", a song from an 1803 lieder collection.

In Protestant Christianity, various metrical settings of Psalm 19 have been published, including "The heav'ns and firmament on high do wondrously declare" in The Whole Booke of Psalmes (Thomas Sternhold and John Hopkins, 1584) and "The heav’ns God’s glory do declare" in the Scottish Psalter (1650).

The Rastafarian song "Rivers of Babylon" (recorded 1970 by The Melodians) includes a reference to the Amidah through verse 14 of Psalm 19 in English together with a reference to Psalm 137 that was written in memory of the first destruction of Zion (Jerusalem) by the Babylonians in 586 BC (the city and the Second Temple were destroyed in 70 AD by the Romans). This song was also popularized as a cover recorded by Boney M. in 1978.

"Torat Hashem Temimah" (The word of God is perfect), consisting of the first five words of verse 8 (in the Hebrew), is a popular Jewish song.

Other 
"The judgements of the Lord are true and righteous altogether", a phrase from Psalm 19:9, is inscribed on the Lincoln Memorial in Washington DC.

References

Sources

External links

 
 
  in Hebrew and English - Mechon-mamre
 Text of Psalm 19 according to the 1928 Psalter
 For the leader. A psalm of David. / The heavens declare the glory of God; / the firmament proclaims the works of his hands text and footnotes, usccb.org United States Conference of Catholic Bishops
 Psalm 19:1 introduction and text, biblestudytools.com
 Psalm 19 – The Heavens, the Word, and the Glory of God enduringword.com
 Psalm 19 / Refrain: The commandment of the Lord is pure / and gives light to the eyes. Church of England
 Hymns for Psalm 19 hymnary.org
 Rabbi Benjamin Segal's commentary on Psalm 19
 Matthew Henry's commentary on Psalm 19 (Matthew Henry (1662–1714) was a post-Reformation scholar)
 Charles Spurgeon's commentary on Psalm 19 (Charles Spurgeon (1834–1892) was England's best-known preacher for the second half of the 19th century.)

019
Shacharit for Shabbat and Yom Tov
Works attributed to David